Paul David Goydos (born June 20, 1964) is an American professional golfer who has played on the Ben Hogan Tour, PGA Tour and PGA Tour Champions.

Early life
Goydos was born and raised in Long Beach, California and is the youngest of three brothers. He began golfing at a very young age, winning his local course championship while still in junior high school. He attended Woodrow Wilson Classical High School, and went on to attend Long Beach State University on a golf scholarship. He graduated with a BA in finance and worked for a short time as a substitute teacher at an inner city high school. He turned pro in 1989 and started out as a struggling mini-tour player, supplementing his income by continuing to work as a substitute teacher.

Professional career
Paul Goydos won the 1990 Long Beach Open, which was his first big breakthrough in his professional career.  This allowed him to attend Qualifying School that fall.  He made the Finals and earned partial exempt status on the Ben Hogan Tour.  

In 1991 and 1992, he played on the Ben Hogan Tour (now Korn Ferry Tour), earning one victory at the 1992 Ben Hogan Yuma Open. He earned his PGA Tour card for 1993 by going through Qualifying School.

Goydos won two PGA Tour events – the 1996 Bay Hill Invitational and the 2007 Sony Open in Hawaii. He has amassed more than 40 top-10 finishes and has more than $12 million in career earnings (on the PGA Tour). His best finish in a major was a T-12 at the 1999 U.S. Open.

Goydos had only two starts in 2004, both coming at the end of the year, because of sinus surgery and hip problems; he played in 2005 under a Major Medical Exemption. His victory at the Sony Open in Hawaii in 2007 elevated Goydos into the top 50 of the Official World Golf Ranking.

Goydos lost in a playoff at The Players Championship in 2008 to Sergio García when he put his tee shot on the par-3 17th (the first playoff hole) in the water.

During the first round of the 2010 John Deere Classic, Goydos became the fourth, and oldest player in PGA Tour history to shoot 59. His round included 12 birdies and 6 pars.

Goydos played in six events in 2012 before bone spurs in his left wrist and subsequent surgery forced him out of action for 15 months. He missed the cut in two events in 2013. He started the 2014 season on a Major Medical Extension, but was unable to satisfy the requirements and was demoted to the Past Champions category. At the same time, Goydos became eligible for the Champions Tour.

PGA Tour Champions career
On September 21, 2014, he earned his first Champions Tour victory in the Pacific Links Hawai'i Championship with a tournament record score of 19-under-par. He became the eighth player to win on all the PGA Tour sponsored major tours (PGA Tour, Korn Ferry Tour, and PGA Tour Champions).

On February 8, 2015, he won his second Champions Tour event, the Allianz Championship in Boca Raton, Florida. He finished his 2015 season with over 1 million dollars earned.

On July 10, 2016, he won his third PGA Tour Champions event, the Dick's Sporting Goods Open in Endicott, New York. He shot 67-66-69, to win by two shots over Wes Short Jr. The signature shot for the tournament was his drive of the sub-300 yard, par-4 16th hole, in which on Saturday, his drive landed less than 10 feet from the hole and he would make the putt for an eagle 2. With this victory, in addition to earning a $300,000 first prize check, vaulted him to collect over 15 million dollars from his combined earnings on the PGA Tour and PGA Tour Champions.

He won his fourth PGA Tour Champions event, the Charles Schwab Cup Championship by posting scores of 62-67-66 to hold off the late charges of Bernhard Langer and Colin Montgomerie. This win put him over the million dollar mark in earnings for the second consecutive year, and he finished the overall Charles Schwab Cup Championship points chase in third place.

At the end of July 2017, Goydos had two top-10 finishes to his credit for the season. During the first round of the 3M Championship, he shot a 2-under-par 70, but over the weekend, he had rounds of 60 (a course record) and 66 to finish at 20-under-par and in a tie with Gene Sauers. Then on the first playoff hole, Sauers hit his second shot in the water and had to take a drop. With Goydos safely on in two shots, he two-putted for a birdie and his fifth win on the PGA Tour Champions. For his last 37 holes played, he shot 19-under-par. By the end of 2017, he had earned $878,168 for the season; which was good enough to finish in the top 20 of the 2017 PGA Tour Champions Tour money list (19 place overall).

In the 2018 season, Goydos had a very solid year of performance which included seven top-10 finishes, amassing over 900,000 dollars earned, and finishing the Charles Schwab Cup standings in 12th place. As of the end of the 2018 season, he has earned just under five million dollars in his PGA Tour Champions career ($4,997,332).

His 2019 season produced very similar results to 2018, with a total of eight top-10 finishes, his highest being at the Regions Tradition (tied for second place), and earning just under 950,000 dollars for the season, to finish in the top 25 of the Charles Schwab Cup standings.

In 2020, he was limited to playing in only 11 events, however, two top-10 finishes late in the season at the Dominion Energy Charity Classic and the Charles Schwab Cup Championship allowed him to earn slightly over $300,000 for 2020. As this season also included the 2021 campaign, another top-ten finish at the Charles Schwab Cup Championship, put his total for the 2020–21 combined season at over one million dollars, and he finished the season in 29th overall place in the Charles Schwab Cup standings. In addition, his PGA Tour Champions career earnings as of end of 2021, were very slightly more the seven million dollars.

For the 2022 PGA Tour Champions season, Goydos continued playing at a constant level of success which included six top-10 finishes, highest being a tie for second at The TimberTech Championship, winnings of $868,875, (to bring his combined PGA Tour and PGA Tour Champions total earnings over $20 million), and finishing the season in the top-20 of the Charles Schwab Cup standings (17th overall). For his PGA Tour Champions career, he has earned $7,877,716.

Ryder Cup
Goydos has not played in the Ryder Cup but was selected by U.S. team captain Corey Pavin as one of his vice-captains for the 2010 event.

Awards
Goydos was inducted into the inaugural class of the Long Beach Golf Hall of Fame in 1996 and was inducted into the Long Beach State 49er Athletic Hall of Fame the same year. The golf ball that was used when he shot 59 is at the World Golf Hall of Fame.

Personal life
Goydos has two children, Chelsea and Courtney. Ex-wife Wendy (Medak) died of a possible drug overdose (pending toxicology report) while attempting to treat migraines in 2009.

Professional wins (10)

PGA Tour wins (2)

PGA Tour playoff record (0–1)

Ben Hogan Tour wins (1)

Other wins (2)
1990 Long Beach Open
1996 EA Sports Challenge Championship

PGA Tour Champions wins (5)

PGA Tour Champions playoff record (1–0)

Results in major championships

CUT = missed the halfway cut
"T" indicates a tie for a place.

Summary

Most consecutive cuts made – 6 (1996 PGA – 1999 PGA)
Longest streak of top-10s – 0

Results in The Players Championship

CUT = missed the halfway cut
"T" indicates a tie for a place

Results in World Golf Championships

QF, R16, R32, R64 = Round in which player lost in match play
"T" = tied

See also
1992 PGA Tour Qualifying School graduates
1993 PGA Tour Qualifying School graduates
2002 PGA Tour Qualifying School graduates
Lowest rounds of golf

References

External links

American male golfers
Long Beach State Beach men's golfers
PGA Tour golfers
PGA Tour Champions golfers
Golfers from California
Sportspeople from Long Beach, California
Sportspeople from Orange County, California
People from Rancho Santa Margarita, California
Wilson Classical High School alumni
1964 births
Living people